This Is My Family is a musical by Tim Firth.

Productions 
The musical made its world premiere at the Crucible Studio, Sheffield running from 19 June to 20 July 2013 directed by Daniel Evans. The production won the 2013 UK Theatre Award for Best Musical.

The production returned to Sheffield at the Lyceum Theatre (opening the theatre after a £2million refurbishment) from 9 to 18 October 2014 before touring to Royal & Derngate, Northampton (21 to 25 October), Belgrade Theatre, Coventry (28 October to 1 November), Liverpool Playhouse (4 to 8 November) and New Wolsey Theatre, Ipswich (11 to 15 November).

The musical was revived again at the Minerva Theatre, Chichester from 20 April to 15 June 2019.

Cast

Creative team

References 

2013 musicals
British musicals
Original musicals